
Koszalin County is a unit of territorial administration and local government (powiat) in West Pomeranian Voivodeship, north-western Poland, on the Baltic coast. It came into being on January 1, 1999, as a result of the Polish local government reforms passed in 1998. Its administrative seat is the city of Koszalin, although the city is not part of the county (it constitutes a separate city county).

As of 2006 its total population is 64,087, out of which the population of Sianów is 6,543, that of Bobolice is 4,446, that of Polanów is 2,967, and the rural population is 50,131.

Neighbouring counties
Apart from the city of Koszalin, Koszalin County is also bordered by Sławno County, Słupsk County and Bytów County to the east, Szczecinek County and Białogard County to the south, and Kołobrzeg County to the west. It also borders the Baltic Sea to the north.

Administrative division
The county is subdivided into eight gminas (three urban-rural and five rural). These are listed in the following table, in descending order of population.

References
Polish official population figures 2006

 
Koszalin